John Harry Ekman (21 September 1908 – 28 August 1979) was a middle and long distance runner from Sweden. He competed in the 3000 m steeplechase at the 1936 Summer Olympics, but failed to reach the final.

References

1908 births
1979 deaths
Swedish male steeplechase runners
Swedish male long-distance runners
Olympic athletes of Sweden
Athletes (track and field) at the 1936 Summer Olympics
People from Lidingö Municipality
Sportspeople from Stockholm County